Tir is the god of written language, schooling, rhetoric, wisdom, and the arts in Armenian mythology.

He was considered to be the scribe and messenger of the chief god Aramazd, as well as a fortune teller and interpreter of dreams, who recorded the good and bad deeds of men and guided souls to the underworld. He was likely connected with Grogh (literally "Writer"), the angel of fate and death in Armenian folk tradition identified with the Archangel Gabriel.

Tir's temple, called  ( means "dream," while the meaning of the ending  is unknown), was located near the city of Artashat. Also named after him was the mountain Tirinkatar, the city Tirakatar, the villages Tre and Tirarich. In the Hellenistic period, Armenians identified Tir with the Greek gods Apollo and Hermes.

Tir shares his name with an Iranian god (Avestan Tishtrya, Modern and Middle Persian Tir) also identified with the planet Mercury, but may be an indigenous Armenian deity identified with the Iranian Tir at a later period. Tir (both the Iranian and Armenian versions) may be identical with the Mesopotamian god of literacy and scribes Nabu (also identified with Mercury).

References

Bibliography

See also
Armenian mythology
Tishtrya
Tir (month)
Týr

Armenian gods
Knowledge gods
Arts gods